Douglas Ollivant is a Senior National Security Studies Fellow at the New America Foundation as well as a Managing Partner at Mantid International.  Most recently, Ollivant was a senior counterinsurgency (COIN) advisor to Regional Command East, as part of the International Security Assistance Force COIN Advisory and Assistance Team. He served as Director for Iraq on the National Security Council under the Bush and Obama administrations.  A retired U.S. Army officer, he has served two tours in the Iraq War, first as the operations officer for the First Battalion, Fifth Cavalry Regiment during OIF II and later as the Chief of Plans for Multi-National Division-Baghdad during the “Surge”, leading the team which wrote the Baghdad Security Plan.

Military service
A former assistant professor at the United States Military Academy's Department of Social Sciences, he is affiliated with a group of military intellectuals, who have been tapped to provide insight and recommendations to General David Petraeus, in what was labeled by Tom Ricks as Petraeus’s “brain trust” or "warrior-intellectuals".  Others in this list include, Brigadier General Bill Rapp, Colonels H.R. McMaster, Peter Mansoor, and Michael Meese, Lieutenant Colonels John Nagl, Mike George, Jen Easterly, Paul Yingling, Bill Ostlund and Charles Miller, as well as Dr. David Kilcullen and Dr. Carter Malkesian.

In her 2008 book, Tell Me How This Ends, Linda Robinson called Ollivant the “right person in the right place at the right time” for his work in devising the operational implementation of the successful Baghdad Security plan.

Military writings
In 2006 Ollivant co-authored, with Eric Chewning, an influential article in Military Review, entitled "Producing Victory: Rethinking Conventional Forces in Counterinsurgency Operations", and a 2007 follow-on article, entitled "Producing Victory: a 2007 postscript for implementation", that articulated the need for US forces to abandon sprawling forward operating bases and move into Iraqi communities.  The premise of the essay was that counterinsurgency requires military units to simultaneous execute security operations, train local security forces, promote economic development, and foster political institutions.  Ollivant and Chewning argued that conventional military units best operate in such an environment when partnered with indigenous security forces co-located among the target population.

The white paper, which was based on Ollivant and Chewning’s experience during combat operations in Iraq in 2004 and 2005, significantly influenced the tactical deployment of US and Iraqi ground forces during the “Surge”.  From October 2006 to December 2007 Ollivant was Chief of Plans for Multi National Division-Baghdad and was the lead coalition force planner for the development and implementation of the Baghdad Security Plan in coordination with the Iraqi Security Forces.

In 2008 a review symposium on the FM 3-24 Counterinsurgency Manual sponsored by Perspectives on Politics, Ollivant called for an expansion of irregular warfare doctrine and warned of a potential over reliance on counterinsurgency frameworks in the future.  He notes that the absence of a larger framework of warfare tends to pull all instances of irregular war into the counterinsurgency model.  This theoretical lacuna presents a difficulty since future conflicts will require peace enforcement, peacekeeping, nation building, and other paradigms to also compete as frameworks for action.

In March 2010, Ollivant and Chewning published an article in The American Interest outlining the military, political, and economic actions necessary for a successful US-Iraqi relationship after the US troop withdrawal.

Other writings
Beyond his contributions to military theory, Ollivant wrote a series of articles and book reviews dealing primarily with Catholic political theorists Jacques Maritain and Orestes Brownson, and edited a book of collected essays on the former.

Education and professional associations
Ollivant, a graduate of the US Army’s School of Advanced Military Studies, holds a PhD and MA in political science from Indiana University (political theory and American politics) and a BA in political science from Wheaton College. He is also a life-member of the Council on Foreign Relations, Veterans of Foreign Wars, and the American Political Science Association.

Media appearances
Following his retirement from the military, Ollivant has appeared on several media outlets to provide perspective on the current state of military and political affairs in Iraq.

Personal
Ollivant is a resident of Central Virginia, with his current wife Sabrina.

References

External links
 Sunni Fighters Find Strategic Benefits in Tentative Alliance With U.S. 
 Embedded in Najaf 
 IRAQ INSPECTION: A LOOK AT WHERE NATION IS HEADED 
 In Najaf, Iraqi Politics Dictate U.S. Tactics 
 New York Times 
 Iraq Ain't No Insurgency, Say Former Petraeus Aides

Written works
 "Review of FM 3-24” in Perspectives on Politics, Volume 6, Number 2 (June 2008)
 “Producing Victory: A 2007 Postscript for Implementation,” in Military Review (March/April 2007)
 “Producing Victory: Rethinking Conventional Forces in COIN Operations,” in Military Review (July/August 2006)
 “Review of Eliot A. Cohen, Supreme Command: Soldiers, Statesmen, and Leadership in Wartime”, in Society 41:3 (March/April 2004).
 “Brownson and Maritain on the American Project,” in Perspectives on Political Science, Volume 37, Number 1 (Winter, 2008).
 Review of George Weigel, The Cube and the Cathedral: Europe, America, and Politics without God in Society, 43:2 (January/February 2006).
 “Review of Jean Bethke Elshtain, Just War Against Terror”, in Society 41:5 (September/October 2004).
 Jacques Maritain and the Many Ways of Knowing, (ed.) The Catholic University of America Press, 2002.
 “The Politics of Realism: Locke, Maritain and Hallowell on Liberalism and Knowledge” in Jacques Maritain and the Many Ways of Knowing, The Catholic University of America Press, 2002.
 "Maverick Conservatism," a review of John A. Murley and John E. Alvis, ed., Willmoore Kendall: Maverick of American Conservatives” in The Modern Age Volume 45, Number 4; Fall 2003.
 “Categorical Imperatives Impair Christianity in Culture” in RELIGION & LIBERTY: A Publication of the Acton Institute for the Study of Religion and Liberty, Volume 13 • Number 4, July and August 2003.

External links

1967 births
Living people
Indiana University alumni
United States Army officers
Counterinsurgency theorists
Guerrilla warfare theorists
American military writers
United States National Security Council staffers